"Hit" is a song written and recorded by Icelandic alternative rock band the Sugarcubes. It was released on 30 December 1991 as the lead single from their third and final studio album, Stick Around for Joy. The song became the band's most successful single, reaching number one on Billboards Modern Rock Tracks chart in the United States, as well as peaking at number 17 on the UK Singles Chart. The song was accompanied by a music video directed by Óskar Jónasson.

Track listings
UK 7-inch vinyl

Side A
 "Hit" – 03:57
Side B
 "Theft" – 03:50

UK 12-inch vinyl

Side A
 "Hit" – 03:57
 "Theft" – 03:50
Side B
 "Hit"  – 03:50
 "Leash Called Love" – 03:42

UK CD1
 "Hit" – 03:57
 "Theft" – 03:50
 "Hit"  – 03:57
 "Chihuahua"  – 03:32

Remixes
 "Hit (Tony Humphries Sweet & Low Mix)" – 7:10
 "Hit (Tony Humphries Papa Bear Mix)" – 5:32

Covers
The track was covered by the English indie rock band Carter the Unstoppable Sex Machine (also known as "Carter USM") in 1993 as a B-side to their single "Lean On Me I Won't Fall Over" off their fourth album, Post Historic Monsters.

Diana Vickers , a singer who first appeared on  The X Factor  in the UK, featured a cover of the song on her debut album  Songs from the Tainted Cherry Tree .

Personnel
Credits adapted from the liner notes of "Hit".
 The Sugarcubes – composition, mixing
 Paul Fox – production, mixing
 Ed Thacker – engineering, mixing
 Chris Laidlaw – engineering assistance
 Scott Blockland – engineering assistance
 Me Company – artwork

Charts

References

1991 singles
Elektra Records singles
Icelandic songs
One Little Indian Records singles